Didier Van Vlaslaer (born 8 February 1955) is a French racing cyclist. He rode in the 1978 Tour de France.

References

1955 births
Living people
French male cyclists
Place of birth missing (living people)